PA15 may refer to:
MAB PA-15 pistol
Pennsylvania Route 15 (1920s)
Pennsylvania's 15th congressional district
Piper PA-15 Vagabond light aircraft
U.S. Route 15 in Pennsylvania